Oliver Burkeman (born 1975) is a British author and journalist, formerly writing the weekly column This Column Will Change Your Life for the newspaper The Guardian. In 2021, he published Four Thousand Weeks: Time Management for Mortals, a self-help book on the philosophy and psychology of time management and happiness.

Early life and education
Burkeman was educated at Huntington School, York, and the University of Cambridge. He was an undergraduate student at Christ’s College, Cambridge and served as editor of the student newspaper Varsity. He graduated in 1994 with a degree in social and political sciences.

Career
Between 2006 and 2020 Burkeman wrote a popular weekly column on psychology, This Column Will Change Your Life. He has reported from London, Washington and New York.

Publications
His published books include:

HELP!: How to Become Slightly Happier and Get a Bit More Done
The Antidote: Happiness for People Who Can't Stand Positive Thinking 
Four Thousand Weeks: Time Management for Mortals

Awards and honours
Burkeman was shortlisted for the Orwell Prize in 2006. He won the Foreign Press Association (FPA) young journalist of the year award. 

In 2015 he won the Foreign Press Association (FPA) science story of the year for a piece on the mystery of consciousness.

References

Alumni of Christ's College, Cambridge
British male journalists
1975 births
Living people
The Guardian journalists